Against All Odds is a 2017 novel by American writer Danielle Steel. The story follows Kate Madison and her family. The title for the novel comes from the idea that she cannot keep her children from “playing against the odds” in their choice of romantic partners.

The novel peaked at No. 3 on the New York Times Best Sellers List.

Characters

Kate Madison- A mother and a businesswoman. Kate's husband died years ago, leaving her with four small children and an uncompleted education. Years later, she became a successful businesswoman.
Bernard Michel- A French man and Kate's love interest
Isabelle- Kate's confident lawyer daughter who falls for a client, Zach Holbrook, that she is representing in a criminal case
Zach Holbrook- A drug dealer who has recently been cut off from his trust fund and refuses to get a real job
Willie- Kate's youngest son
Julie- Kate's daughter. A meek fashion designer who abandons her career and moves across the country to be with her new husband
Justin- Kate's son and Julie's twin. He is a writer and the most together of Kate's children. He and his partner Richard deal with the struggles of parenthood.
Peter-Julie's husband. He was perfect before the marriage then started to maltreat Julie when they got married.

Plot

The book revolves around Kate Madison, a widow who owns a successful retail shop in SoHo. Kate is dedicated to her four adult children, but grows frustrated with their choice of partners that are seemingly not right for them. Kate learns to allow her children to make their own decisions, and be there for them unconditionally.

Kate also has a brief love affair of her own, falling for the Frenchman Bernard Michel. However, she later finds out that he is married, and realizes she is in the same position of choosing an ill-suited partner as her children.

Reception

James Kidd of the South China Morning Post gave the book two out of five stars, stating that the novel was propelled more by the heroine's children then the heroine herself, and that much of the novel consists of the protagonist contemplating “her brood’s stupidest decisions as if they are Nobel Prize acceptance speeches.” Kidd concluded his review by adding “It’s OK, if predictable.”

Marilyn Gore of The Free Press Journal criticized the novel for its slow beginning and called the writing “phoned-in.” She also criticized the novel for its lack of character development, saying “These horrible partners — the deadbeat druggie manchild, the abusive future murderer and the cheat — come off as caricatures rather than rounded characters.”

References

2017 American novels
Novels by Danielle Steel
Delacorte Press books
Contemporary romance novels
American romance novels